Jorden Hall is a historic building located on the campus of the University of Sioux Falls in Sioux Falls, South Dakota.  It was designed by architect Joseph Schwarz and built in 1908.

It was listed on the National Register of Historic Places in 2000.

References

School buildings on the National Register of Historic Places in South Dakota
Gothic Revival architecture in South Dakota
School buildings completed in 1908
National Register of Historic Places in Sioux Falls, South Dakota
1908 establishments in South Dakota
University of Sioux Falls